Hutanjapyx is a genus of diplurans in the family Japygidae.

Species
 Hutanjapyx simpan Pagés, 1995

References

Diplura